Praetaxilia segecia, commonly known as the harlequin metalmark or Australian metalmark, is the only butterfly of the metalmark family, Riodinidae, found in Australia, where it is restricted to northern Queensland. It is also found in New Guinea and on nearby smaller islands such as Aru.

References

Riodininae
Butterflies described in 1861